Ambili Ammavan is a 1986 Indian Malayalam film, directed by KG Vijayakumar. The film stars Jagathy Sreekumar, Nedumudi Venu, Kalaranjini and Santhakumari in lead roles. The film had musical score by Kannur Rajan.

Cast
Jagathy Sreekumar
Nedumudi Venu
Kalaranjini
Santhakumari
Guinness Pakru
Baby Ambili Jacob

References

External links
 

1986 films
1980s Malayalam-language films